(born March 28, 1985) is a Japanese former competitive figure skater. She is the 2012 World Championships bronze medalist, a three-time Grand Prix Final medalist (2011 silver, 2009 & 2012 bronze), a two-time Four Continents silver medalist (2010, 2013), the 2007 Winter Universiade champion, and the 2013 Japanese national champion. She placed eighth at the 2010 and 2014 Winter Olympics.

Personal life
Suzuki was born on March 28, 1985 in Toyohashi, Aichi Prefecture. She became engaged to a former classmate in June 2016 and married him on February 1, 2017. They divorced in 2018.

Career

Suzuki trained in Nagoya, Japan. At the same time, she worked for Toho Real Estate, which has its own skating rink.

Early career 
Suzuki won the bronze medal at the 2001–02 Junior Grand Prix Final. After a successful junior career, she was hampered by her struggles with anorexia nervosa which began at age 18 when she left home for university. Her weight having fallen to 32 kg, she was unable to jump and missed the entire 2003–2004 season. It took her a year to gain back the weight she had lost.

2004–2005 to 2008–2009 
Suzuki returned to competitive skating in the 2004–2005 season after being inspired by Shizuka Arakawa's victory at the 2004 World Championships. She began working with coach Hiroshi Nagakubo in the early 2000s.

She had a breakthrough in 2007–2008, winning several events, and achieving her highest finish at Japanese nationals since 2002. She consequently received her first senior Grand Prix assignment in 2008–2009, and won the silver medal at the 2008 NHK Trophy. That same season, she also won the 2008 Finlandia Trophy and finished 8th at the 2009 Four Continents Championships.

2009–2010 season
Suzuki appeared at two Grand Prix events, winning the 2009 Cup of China and finishing 5th at the 2009 Skate Canada International. She qualified to the 2009–10 Grand Prix Final, where she won the bronze medal. She was awarded a place on the Japanese Olympic team after she placed second at the 2009–10 Japan Championships. She was also assigned to compete at the 2010 Four Continents Championships, where she won the silver medal. At the Olympics, she finished 8th, and was later 11th at the 2010 World Championships – her first senior Worlds.

2010–2011 season
Suzuki opened her season with gold at the 2010 Finlandia Trophy. She received silver at both of her Grand Prix events, the 2010 Cup of Russia and the 2010 Cup of China. She qualified for her second consecutive Grand Prix Final, this time finishing fourth. A fourth-place finish at the national championships left her off the Worlds team, but she was selected to go to the 2011 Four Continents Championships, where she finished 7th.

2011–2012 season

Competing again on the Grand Prix series, Suzuki won the silver medal at the 2011 Skate Canada International and the gold medal at the 2011 NHK Trophy. Her placements qualified her for the 2011 Grand Prix Final where she won the silver medal. She won the silver behind Mao Asada at the 2011–12 Japan Championships. At the 2012 World Championships, Suzuki won the bronze medal, becoming the oldest ladies' single skater to medal at the event since Maria Butyrskaya. At the 2012 ISU World Team Trophy, she won the ladies' event, defeating World champion Carolina Kostner. Team Japan also won the event overall.

2012–2013 season
Suzuki received the same Grand Prix assignments as the previous season. She won the silver medal at the 2012 Skate Canada International and the 2012 NHK Trophy, qualifying her for the 2012–13 Grand Prix Final. At the final, she placed third in the short program. She fell twice in the free skating, finishing third overall. In December 2012, Suzuki said that the 2013–14 season would be her last. She finished fourth at the 2012–13 Japan Championships behind Satoko Miyahara.

Suzuki won the silver medal at the 2013 Four Continents Championships, as part of a Japanese sweep of the ladies' event with teammates Mao Asada and Kanako Murakami taking the gold and bronze medal respectively. She placed twelfth at the 2013 World Championships. At the 2013 World Team Trophy, Suzuki placed first; Team Japan placed third overall. Her free skating score of 133.02 and her combined total score of 199.58 are her personal best scores.

2013–2014 season
Suzuki began her season at the 2013 Finlandia Trophy, where she won the silver medal behind Yulia Lipnitskaya. She won another silver at the 2013 Skate Canada International, again behind Lipnitskaya. At the 2013 NHK Trophy, she earned the bronze medal after placing second in the short and fourth in the free skating.

Suzuki won gold at the 2013–14 Japan Championships, ahead of Kanako Murakami and Mao Asada. She placed second in the short program behind Asada, but rebounded to first place after winning the free skating. She skated two clean programs and earned the highest free skating and total score to date in the ladies' event at the Japan Figure Skating Championships.

At the 2014 Winter Olympics, Suzuki competed in the free skating portion of the figure skating team event, placing fourth in that segment; Japan finished fifth overall. She went on to place eighth in the ladies' singles competition. At the 2014 World Championships, she placed fourth in the short program with a personal best score, eighth in the free skating, and sixth overall. Following the World Championships, Suzuki announced her retirement from competitive skating.

Post-competitive career 
Following her retirement in 2014, Suzuki began working as a choreographer and teaching with her longtime coach, Hiroshi Nagakubo, at the Howa Sports Land Skating Club in the Aichi Prefecture. She has choreographed for Rika Hongo, Yuhana Yokoi, Sota Yamamoto, Lim Eun-soo, and other young skaters. She credited figure skating choreographers Shae-Lynn Bourne and Pasquale Camerlengo for inspiring her to start working as a choreographer. Suzuki was also a main cast member of the annual touring ice show Fantasy on Ice, having participated in all editions from 2010 to 2019. In 2022 she did the commentary for the live broadcast at the tour stop in Nagoya amongst others.

Programs

Post-2014

Pre-2014

Competitive highlights
 GP: Grand Prix; JGP: Junior Grand Prix

Detailed results

Small medals for short program and free skating awarded only at ISU Championships. At team events, medals awarded for team results only.

  – This is a team event; medals are awarded for the team results only.
  – team result
  – personal/individual result

References

External links

 

1985 births
Living people
Japanese female single skaters
Figure skaters at the 2007 Winter Universiade
People from Toyohashi
Medalists at the 2007 Winter Universiade
Olympic figure skaters of Japan
Figure skaters at the 2010 Winter Olympics
World Figure Skating Championships medalists
Four Continents Figure Skating Championships medalists
Figure skaters at the 2014 Winter Olympics
Universiade medalists in figure skating
Universiade gold medalists for Japan
Competitors at the 2005 Winter Universiade
Fantasy on Ice main cast members
Figure skating choreographers